William George Welsh (30 June 1908 – 11 August 1987) was an Australian rules footballer who played with Geelong in the Victorian Football League (VFL).

Welsh, who was born in Berringa, came to Geelong from local side Geelong West. He made five appearances for Geelong, one in the 1929 VFL season and four in 1930. His 1930 season ended on a good note as he was a centre half-back in Geelong's seconds premiership.

References

External links

1908 births
Australian rules footballers from Victoria (Australia)
Geelong Football Club players
Geelong West Football Club players
1987 deaths